Champigneulles is a commune in the Meurthe-et-Moselle department in north-eastern France.

It is home to L'Arboretum de Bellefontaine.

The Champigneulles brewery, founded on 20 June 1897, was for a long time the most important production site of the Société Européenne de Brasserie (SEB), which owned more than twenty production sites in France. In 1987 SEB merged with Kronenbourg Brewery. In 2006 Kronenbourg sold the site to Frankfurter Brauhaus, a German brewery in Frankfurt an der Oder.

The writer and author Élise Fischer is born in Champigneulles on 13 July 1948.

Population

See also
 Communes of the Meurthe-et-Moselle department

References

Communes of Meurthe-et-Moselle